The median aperture (also known as the medial aperture, and foramen of Magendie) drains cerebrospinal fluid (CSF) from the fourth ventricle into the cisterna magna. The two other openings of the fourth ventricle are the lateral apertures (also called the foramina of Luschka), one on the left and one on the right, which drain cerebrospinal fluid into the cerebellopontine angle cistern. The median foramen on axial images is posterior to the pons and anterior to the caudal cerebellum. It is surrounded by the obex and gracile tubercles of the medulla, tela choroidea of the fourth ventricle and its choroid plexus, which is attached to the cerebellar vermis.

Eponym
The foramen of Magendie is named for François Magendie, who first described it.

Additional images

References

Ventricular system